Scaeosopha rotundivalvula is a species of moth of the family Cosmopterigidae. It is found in China and on Sumatra.

The wingspan is about 18 mm.

References

Moths described in 2005
Scaeosophinae